Mu Qing (September 18, 1569 – November 23, 1597), also known as A-sheng A-chai (his Nakhi name), was the 19th Tusi of Lijiang.

References

|-style="text-align: center; background: #FFE4E1;"
|align="center" colspan="3"|Mu Qing

Politicians from Yunnan
Ming dynasty politicians
1569 births
1597 deaths
People from Lijiang